Daggubati Ramanaidu (6 June 1936 – 18 February 2015) was an Indian film producer known for his work in Telugu cinema. He founded Suresh Productions in 1964 which became of one of the largest film production companies in India. He was placed in the Guinness Book of World Records for the most films produced by an individual, with more than 150 films in 13 Indian languages. He also served as a Member of Parliament for the Bapatla constituency in Andhra Pradesh in the 13th Lok Sabha from 1999 to 2004.

In 2012, Ramanaidu was conferred with the third-highest civilian award of India, the Padma Bhushan, in recognition for his contribution to Indian cinema. In 2009, he was conferred with the Dada Saheb Phalke Award, the highest award for films in Indian cinema. He has also received the Raghupathi Venkaiah Award, and the Filmfare Lifetime Achievement Award – South for his work in Telugu cinema. Ramanaidu contributed a substantial part of his earnings to numerous philanthropic purposes under the "Ramanaidu Charitable Trust" that was founded in 1991.

Early life
Daggubati Ramanaidu was born on 6 June 1936 into an agricultural family in Karamchedu, a village in Prakasam district in the present day Andhra Pradesh. He completed his schooling in the village and had his college education in Chirala and later graduated out of the Presidency College, Chennai.

He started his career as a rice-mill owner and later got into the transport business. During this time, his father joined with a relative and co-produced the Telugu film Nammina Bantu (1958), starring Akkineni Nageswara Rao and Savitri. He performed the dupe of Nageswara Rao in the film. Nageswara Rao advised him to go to Madras (now Chennai) and work with film-makers. He closed down his rice mill as he was not happy with it, and moved to Madras in 1962. He intended to start a brick business, but later switched to real estate. His frequent visits to the "Andhra Club" got him acquainted with the Telugu film fraternities.

Film career
In 1963, Ramanaidu partnered with his friends Tagirisa Hanumantha Rao, Yarlagadda Lakshmaiah Chowdary and co-produced the commercially unsuccessful Anuragam (1963). Following that, he established his own production house Suresh Productions, and produced Ramudu Bheemudu (1964). Until the early 1970s, he kept to Telugu cinema and made films such as Pratigna Palana (1965), Sri Krishna Tulabharam (1966), Shree Janma (1967), Paapa Kosam (1968) and Sepoy Chinnaiah (1969). Ramudu Bheemudu remained his only box office success during this period. While in Madras, he partnered with B. Nagi Reddy's sons and formed a company called "Vijaya Suresh Combines" and made some films under that house.

In 1971, he produced Prem Nagar, starring Akkineni Nageswara Rao and Vanisri. The film went on to become a "blockbuster" and its success prompted Tamil and Hindi remakes entitled Vasantha Maligai (1972) and Prem Nagar (1974), respectively. Both versions were produced by him and became equally successful. Namma Kuzhaindagal, Tirumangalyam, Madhurageetham, Kuzhaindaikaga and Deiva Piravi are some of his Tamil productions that were made during the 1970s.

As all the studios were based in Madras at that date, he started "Ramanaidu Studios" in Hyderabad with the help of the state government in 1983. While frequently making films in Telugu and Tamil, he branched out into the Kannada, Hindi, Malayalam, Marathi, Bengali, Oriya film, Gujarati, Bhojpuri, Assamese and Punjabi industries. His Hindi films include Dildaar, Tohfa, Anari, Hum Aapke Dil Mein Rehte Hain and Aaghaaz.

As of 2015, he had made more than 130 films in 13 Indian languages. The feat earned him a place in the Guinness Book of World Records in 2008. Ramanaidu also acted in a few films, mostly his own productions. He played a full-length role for the first time in the 2007 Telugu film Hope. The film, which dealt with teenage suicides arising out of educational stress among students, won the award for Best Film on Other Social Issues at the 54th National Film Awards.

Family and personal life

Ramanaidu got married in 1958 and had three children, two sons and a daughter. His elder son D. Suresh Babu is a producer and his younger son Venkatesh is an actor in Telugu cinema. He had eight grandchildren, two of whom – Rana and Naga Chaitanya – are actors in Telugu cinema.

Ramanaidu was a member of the Telugu Desam Party and represented Baptala constituency of Guntur district in the 13th Lok Sabha from 1999 to 2004. He lost the 2004 election for the same seat in the 14th Lok Sabha.

Awards and honors

Civilian Honors
Padma Bhushan - 2012

National Film Awards
National Film Award for Best Feature Film in Bengali – Asukh (1999)
National Film Award for Best Film on Other Social Issues - Hope (2006)
Dadasaheb Phalke Award - 2009

Nandi Awards
 Nandi Award for Best Feature Film - Andhra Vaibhavam
 Nandi Award for Best Feature Film - Preminchu (2001)
 Raghupathi Venkaiah Award - 2006

Tamil Nadu State Film Awards
Tamil Nadu State Film Award for Best Film (Third prize) – Namma Kuzhanthaigal (1970)
Tamil Nadu State Film Award for Best Film (Second prize) – Madhurageetham (1977)

Filmfare Awards South
Filmfare Award for Best Telugu Film – Jeevana Tarangalu (1973)
Filmfare Award for Best Telugu Film – Soggadu (1976)
Filmfare Lifetime Achievement Award – South (2000)

Other Honors
 Honorary doctorate from Sri Venkateswara University, Tirupati

Death
In January 2014, it was reported that Ramanaidu had been diagnosed with prostate cancer. He died on 18 February 2015, at the age of 78, in Hyderabad, Telangana. Many Tollywood stars like Nandamuri Balakrishna, Nagarjuna, Ravi Teja, K. Raghavendra Rao, Pawan Kalyan, Ram Charan Allu Arjun and N. T. Rama Rao Jr. paid their last respects to Rama Naidu.

Partial filmography

Telugu

 Ramudu Bheemudu
 Prem Nagar
 Jeevana Tarangalu
 Chakravakam
 Soggadu
 Agni Poolu
 Devata
 Mundadugu
 Sangharshana
 Kathanayakudu
 Kaliyuga Pandavulu
 Ramu
 Aha Naa Pellanta
 Chinababu
 Brahma Puthrudu
 Prema
 Indrudu Chandrudu
 Bobbili Raja
 Coolie No. 1
 Super Police
 Dharma Chakram
 Oho Naa Pellanta
 Preminchukundam Raa
 Ganesh
 Preyasi Rave
 Kalisundam Raa
 Jayam Manadera
 Preminchu
 Nee Premakai
 Nuvvu Leka Nenu Lenu
 Hari Villu
 Vijayam
 Neeku Nenu Naaku Nuvvu
 Malliswari
 Soggadu
 Nireekshana
 Sri Krishna 2006
 Madhumasam
 Tulasi
 Kousalya Supraja Rama 
 Baladoor
 Bendu Apparao R.M.P
 Aalasyam Amrutam
 Mugguru
 Masala
 Nenem…Chinna Pillana?
 Bhimavaram Bullodu
 Drushyam
 Gopala Gopala

Hindi
 Dil Aur Deewar (1978)
 Prem Nagar (1974)
 Tohfa (1984)
 Dilwaala (1986)
 Anari (1993)
 Santaan (1993)
 Taqdeerwala (1995)
 Hum Aapke Dil Mein Rehte Hain (1999)
 Aaghaaz (2000)
 Kuch Tum Kaho Kuch Hum Kahein (2002)

Tamil
Kuzhanthaikkaga (1968)
Namma Kuzhandaigal (1970)
 Vasantha Maligai (1972)
Madhurageetham (1977)
 Thanikattu Raja (1982)
Deivapiravi (1985)
 Michael Raj (1987)
 Kai Naattu (1988)

Malayalam
Ashwaroodan (2006)

Kannada
 Jeevana Taranga (1968)
 Thavarumane Udugore (1991)
 Mangalya (1991)
 Maduve Aagona Baa (2001)

Bengali
 Asukh (1999)

Punjabi
 Singh vs Kaur (2013)

Marathi
 Mazi Aai

References

External links

1936 births
2015 deaths
Dadasaheb Phalke Award recipients
Recipients of the Padma Bhushan in arts
Film producers from Andhra Pradesh
India MPs 1999–2004
Telugu politicians
Telugu Desam Party politicians
Lok Sabha members from Andhra Pradesh
People from Prakasam district
Filmfare Awards South winners
Nandi Award winners
Tamil film producers
Hindi film producers
Tamil Nadu State Film Awards winners
Telugu film producers
20th-century Indian businesspeople
21st-century Indian businesspeople
Deaths from prostate cancer